Kym Mazelle (born Kymberly Grigsby; August 10, 1960) is an American singer. She is regarded as a pioneer of house music in the United Kingdom and Europe. Her music combines R&B, soul, funk, house music, dance, and pop. She is credited as "The First Lady of House Music".

Biography

Early life 
Mazelle was born in Gary, Indiana. She lived on the same street as the Jackson family and knew Michael Jackson's mother and uncle. In 1981, she attended Mundelein College in Chicago. In 1982, she transferred to Columbia College Chicago, where she graduated with a bachelor's degree in Arts and Entertainment Media Management in 1986. During college, she worked part-time as an intern and secretary at Lyric Opera of Chicago.

Career 
In 1987, she worked with record producer Marshall Jefferson on the single "Taste My Love", released on Police Records label. In 1988, she released the single "Useless (I Don't Need You Now)", a hit on the club charts which reached at No. 53 on the UK singles chart. Her next release, "Wait," a duet with Robert Howard from The Blow Monkeys in 1989, peaked at No. 7 in the UK. In 1989, Mazelle's debut album Crazy was released in the UK and featured the single "Love Strain". With the single "Was That All It Was" returned Mazelle to the UK Top 40 and "Useless (I Don't Need You Now)" was remixed by Norman Cook.

In 1990, Mazelle joined British music group Soul II Soul. Her lead vocals on the single "Missing You" on their second album Vol. II: 1990 – A New Decade achieved major success worldwide. She also toured with the group throughout the year and their concert DVD A New Decade: Live from Brixton Academy was released in September 1990. In 1991, Parlophone Records repackaged Mazelle's debut album as Brilliant!! with remixes of her singles, two new tracks and remixes of "No One Can Love You More Than Me" and "Crazy 'Bout The Man". Mazelle also appeared as "Pattie Roman" on the show Trainer, a sitcom originating from Great Britain.

In 1994, she scored a No. 13 hit in the UK with a cover on "No More Tears (Enough Is Enough)", with Jocelyn Brown. Two years later, in 1996, Mazelle released a cover version of the song "Young Hearts Run Free", which appeared in the 1996 Baz Luhrmann film William Shakespeare's Romeo + Juliet and also appeared on the director's remix album Something for Everybody. The soundtrack went triple platinum in the United States of America. The success of the single re-invited Mazelle to perform on Top of the Pops.

She has appeared on two live albums by Maceo Parker, Life on Planet Groove and My First Name is Maceo. Mazelle released her second album The Pleasure Is All Mine in June 2004 and undertook a tour in the UK. The album spawned two singles: "Love Magic" and "On My Own". In 2005, Mazelle took part in the British version of the reality TV show, Celebrity Fit Club. In April 2007, she appeared in the Ray Charles's tribute show "I Can't Stop Loving You".

In July 2010, Mazelle joined the cast of UK theatre production of Smokey Joe's Cafe. She also appeared on the BBC Television series, Celebrity MasterChef. In September 2010, she released an extended play titled Destiny.

She headlined Liverpool Pride on August 6, 2011. On November 3, 2011, she headlined Prince Charles's Prince's Trust Ambassador Ball in Glasgow and helped to raise £93,000.00 for the charity on the night. On April 6, 2013, her appearance on The Voice UK was broadcast on the BBC. In 2017, Mazelle embarked on her 30th Anniversary Tour, celebrating thirty years in the music industry.

Discography

Albums 
 Crazy / Brilliant! (1989)
 The Pleasure Is All Mine (2004)
 Destiny (2010)

Compilations 
 Brilliant!! (1991) – European remix compilation, with 3 new tracks
 The Gold Collection (1996)

Singles

Solo singles

As featured artist

Filmography

Television

Tours 
 A New Decade Tour (1990) (with Soul II Soul)
 25 Year Anniversary Tour (2011–12) (with Soul II Soul)
 Kym Mazelle 30th Anniversary Tour (2017)

References

External links 
 Kym Mazelle official website
 

1960 births
Living people
20th-century American women singers
21st-century American women singers
African-American women singer-songwriters
American women singer-songwriters
American dance musicians
American expatriates in England
American women pop singers
American house musicians
American rhythm and blues singer-songwriters
American soul singers
American women in electronic music
Capitol Records artists
Columbia College Chicago alumni
Musicians from Gary, Indiana
The Voice UK contestants
20th-century American singers
21st-century American singers
20th-century African-American women singers
21st-century African-American women singers
Singer-songwriters from Indiana
Soul II Soul members